Moulhard is a commune in the Eure-et-Loir department in northern France.

Geography
Moulhard is located in the canton of Authon-du-Perche within the Perche Gouët area. It is 60 km south west of Chartres and 82 km north east of Le Mans on the A11.

History
Moulhard is an agricultural settlement which traces its history back to the year 810 when it was known as Villa Molevardi. 
Moulhard is on the route of a Roman road running from Chartres to Le Mans; it was a main route up to the 18th century, known as Caesar's way or Henri IV's way.

Attractions
The church of Notre-Dame takes part in the annual pilgrimage of Saint Marcou on 1 May.

Population

See also
 Communes of the Eure-et-Loir department

References

Communes of Eure-et-Loir